New Chautauqua is a studio album by jazz guitarist Pat Metheny. It was released in 1979.

Track listing

Personnel
 Pat Metheny – electric 6- and 12-string guitars, acoustic guitar, 15-string harp guitar, electric bass

Charts
Album – Billboard

References

Pat Metheny albums
1979 albums
Albums produced by Manfred Eicher
ECM Records albums